Lü Shihao (born 16 July 2002) is a Chinese footballer currently playing as a midfielder for Guangzhou.

Club career
Having played for the Evergrande Football School, Lü moved to Spain to join Lleida Esportiu alongside teammate Lu Qi in November 2020.

Career statistics

Club
.

References

2002 births
Living people
Chinese footballers
Association football midfielders
Villarreal CF players
Lleida Esportiu footballers
Guangzhou F.C. players
Chinese expatriate footballers
Chinese expatriate sportspeople in Spain
Expatriate footballers in Spain